The 2015 Boels Rental Ladies Tour also known as the 2015 Holland Ladies Tour is the 18th edition of the Holland Ladies Tour, a women's cycle stage race in the Netherlands. The tour is part of the 2014 women's road cycling calendar and was held 1 September to 6 September. The tour has six stages, including an individual time trial. The tour starts with the first stages in and around   Tiel and concludes with a hilly stage in Limburg. The tour has an UCI rating of 2.1.

Preview
The favorites for the overall title are Ellen van Dijk (Boels-Dolmans), Amy Pieters (Liv-Plantur), Lucinda Brand (Rabo-Liv) and Lisa Brennauer (Velocio-SRAM). For Ellen van Dijk (who won the Tour in 2013) it his her first race after she broke her collarbone in the 2015 La Course by Le Tour de France. She had a speedy recovery and went to a high altitude training, but it is unknown what her shape is.

For the sprint stages the most important sprinters will be: Kirsten Wild (Hitec), Jolien D'hoore (Wiggle-Honda) and Lucy Garner (Liv-Plantur).

Stages

Stage 1
1 September – Zeddam to 's-Heerenberg,

Stage 2
2 September – Tiel to Tiel, 

|}

Stage 3
3 September – Tiel to Tiel,

Stage 4
4 September – Oosterhout to Oosterhout, (Individual time trial) 
German Time Trial World Champion Lisa Brennauer (Velocio-SRAM) won the time trial, two seconds ahead of Ellen van Dijk (Boels-Dolmans). During the time trial it started raining after Brennauer and Van Dijk were finished, which was a disadvantage for the riders finishing later. Brennauer was very happy winning in het world champion rainbow jersey. Van Dijk, who won the time trial previous year and the 2013 World Time Trial Champion broke her collarbone at the 2015 La Course by Le Tour de France. She was also happy with her result and gave her confidence that she was well recovered. With winning the time trial Brennauer also took the lead in the general classification.

Stage 5
5 September – Gennep to Gennep,

Stage 6
6 September – Bunde to Valkenburg,

See also

 2015 in women's road cycling

References

External links
 

Boels Rental Ladies Tour
Boels Rental Ladies Tour
Holland Ladies Tour
Cycling in Gelderland
Cycling in North Brabant
Cycling in Gennep
Cycling in Meerssen
Cycling in Tiel
Cycling in Valkenburg aan de Geul
Sport in Montferland
Sport in Oosterhout